Yagub Javad oghlu Mammadov (born 3 March 1941), commonly known as Yagub (also Jacob in English) Mammadov (was the acting President of Azerbaijan from 6 March to 14 May and from 18 to 19 May 1992. Mammadov is currently an opposition politician, professor and scientist.

Early life
Mammadov was born on 3 March 1941 in Ali-Ismailli village of Gadabay rayon of Azerbaijan. He graduated from the pediatrics faculty of Azerbaijan Medical University. Mammadov is a professor at Azerbaijan Medical University, delivering lectures on pathophysiology since 1966. His scientific researches include but are not limited to a study of fundamental problems of lymphology. Mammadov has 370 scientific publications.

Political career
In the midst of political turmoil in Azerbaijan, Yaqub Mammadov, then the rector of Azerbaijan Medical University, was elected the Speaker of National Assembly of Azerbaijan on 5 March during the extraordinary session of the parliament related to the Khojaly Massacre of Azerbaijani civilians in Nagorno-Karabakh region of Azerbaijan after the speaker of the parliament, Elmira Gafarova resigned from her post. On 6 March, President Ayaz Mutalibov was forced to resign and according to the Azerbaijani constitution of the period, speaker of the parliament, Yagub Mammadov assumed the presidential duties and responsibilities until the new elections. While acting as the President of Azerbaijan, Mammadov met with Levon Ter-Petrosian in Tehran in an effort to start peace talks mediated by Iran. On 8 May, when the Tehran Communiqué between Ter-Petrosian and Mammadov was signed, Armenian forces captured Shusha. In his interviews, Mammadov always refused to assume any responsibility for loss of Shusha. 

On 14 May, the former President Mutalibov returned to power after the parliament relieved him off the responsibility for the Khojaly Massacre, but was ousted by the armed revolt led by Azerbaijan Popular Front on 15 May. Yaqub Mammadov resigned as Speaker of the Parliament on 18 May 1992 and was then replaced by Isa Gambar.

References

1941 births
Living people
People from Gadabay District
Chairmen of the National Assembly (Azerbaijan)
Azerbaijani pediatricians
Azerbaijani pathologists
Azerbaijani professors
Presidents of Azerbaijan
Soviet pediatricians
Soviet pathologists